FC Barcelona did not repeat its successful season in 1998–99, and fell back to second in La Liga, as well as knocked out of the Champions League in the semi-finals.

Barcelona did not perform well in the mid season and lost the league title to Deportivo La Coruña just 5 points behind and Louis van Gaal was let go by the club, with former Real Betis coach Lorenzo Serra Ferrer taking over after 1999–2000 season.

Despite the trophyless season, the side managed to reach the semi-finals of the UEFA Champions League, where it lost to eventual competition runners up Valencia.

Squad
Squad at end of season

Transfers

In
  Jari Litmanen –  Ajax
  Simão –  Sporting CP
  Dani –  Mallorca
  Frédéric Déhu –  Lens

Out
  Miguel Ángel Nadal –  Mallorca
  Sonny Anderson –  Lyon
  Giovanni – Olympiacos
  Mauricio Pellegrino –  Valencia
  Albert Celades –  Celta Vigo
  Roger García –  Espanyol
  Óscar García –  Valencia (loan)
  Dragan Ćirić –  AEK Athens (loan)
  Samuel Okunowo –  Benfica (loan)

Competitions

La Liga

League table

Results by round

Matches

Copa del Rey

Second round

Eightfinals

Quarterfinals

Semifinals

UEFA Champions League

First group stage

Group B

Second group stage

Group A

Quarter-finals

Semi-finals

Supercopa

Statistics

Players statistics

References

1999-00
Barcelona